Perpetuus is Latin for "continuous, entire or universal", and can refer to:

People
Saint Perpetuus, sixth bishop of Tours
L. Marius Maximus Perpetuus Aurelianus II, a Roman consul (see List of late imperial Roman consuls)

Titles
dictator perpetuo, Latin for "dictator in perpetuity"
A parish priest of a particular type was called a perpetual curate (curatus perpetuus)

Other
Perpetuum mobile